The Yamaha YZF-R1, or simply R1, is a -class sports motorcycle made by Yamaha. It was first released in 1998, undergoing significant updates in 2000, 2002, 2004, 2006, 2007, 2009, 2015, 2018 and 2020.

1998–1999
 
Yamaha launched the YZF-R1 in 1998 after redesigning the Genesis engine to create a more compact engine by raising the gearbox input shaft and allowing the gearbox output shaft to be placed beneath it. This "stacked gearbox" was followed by other manufacturers. Compacting the engine made it much shorter, allowing the wheelbase to be shortened as well and the center of gravity to be optimized. The swingarm could be made longer without compromising the overall wheelbase, which was a short . Four 40 mm Keihin CV carburetors fed fuel to the engine.

The R1 was also equipped with a 41 mm KYB upside-down front fork and 300 mm semi-floating disc brakes. The instrument panel was electronic, with a self diagnosis system and digital speed readout. The exhaust used Yamaha's Exhaust Ultimate Power Valve (EXUP) system, which controlled exhaust gas flow to maximize engine power production at all revs, resulting in a high-power and high-torque engine.

The Yamaha YZF-R6 was introduced in 1999 as the 600 cc version of the R1 super bike.

The 1999 R1 saw only minor changes, apart from paint and graphics. Improvements included a redesigned gear change linkage and an increase in gear change shaft length.

2000–2001

In 2000, Yamaha introduced a series of changes to improve the R1, and minor changes to the bodywork to allow for better long-duration ride handling. Yamaha's main design goal was to sharpen the pre-existing bike and not to redesign it.

At  at the rear wheel, top-end output remained the same, but changes to the engine management system were intended to result in a smoother, broader distribution of power. The bodywork remained similar to that of the previous R1, although a 3% reduction in the drag coefficient was achieved. The headlight housing's profile was sharpened, the side panels were made more aerodynamic, and the windscreen was reshaped for better rider protection.

The seating area was also updated. The fuel tank was reshaped, with a more relaxed rear angle and deeper leg recesses to provide a better riding feel. The seat extended further towards the rear of the tank, and the new steeper seating position put additional weight on the front end. All of this was aimed at improving weight bias, thus offering sharper cornering and more stability.

Mechanically, the carburetors were re-jetted in an effort to improve throttle response, especially in the low end, all the way up to the bike's 11,750 rpm redline. The redesigned camshafts were lightened and used internal oil ways to lubricate journals that, when combined with reduced tappet clearance, provided less friction and created less engine noise. The gearbox received a taller first gear, a hollow chrome-moly gear change shaft with an additional bearing, and a completely redesigned shift linkage and foot pedal. These changes were aimed at eliminating problems with the transmission in earlier models, and to help seamlessly transfer the bike's power to the road.

2002–2003

A new fuel injection system was introduced for the 2002 year, which worked like a carburetor by employing a CV carburetor slide controlled by a vacuum created by the engine. With a similar power output to the 2000-2001 bike, though, the engine remained largely the same. One notable improvement was the use of new cylinder sleeves of a high silicon content alloy containing magnesium that minimized thermal distortion, reducing oil consumption. The exhaust system was changed from a 4-into-1 to a new titanium 4-into-2-into-1 design.

Also in 2002, Yamaha released the newly developed Deltabox frame, whose hydro-formed construction reduced the total number of frame welds and improved the frame's rigidity by 30%. The cooling system was redesigned for better performance and compactness. The rear end of the motorcycle was updated and streamlined with an LED taillight, allowing for cleaner rear body lines when choosing one of several common aftermarket modifications. These modifications included removal of the turn signal stalks and stock license plate bracket, and replacing them with replacements that "hugged" the body or frame. The 2002 model also saw front lighting improvements in the form of sharper headlights and the addition of side "parking" lights within the twin-headlight panel, giving a more angular appearance. This also provided additional aftermarket possibilities, such as the removal of the front turn signals and the repurposing of the parking lights as directional or hazard markers while stopped.

For 2003, the only change was the addition of hazard warning lights and low-beam headlights, which stay on when the engine is running.

2004–2005

With the competition advancing, Yamaha made some major changes to the R1. This included style updates, like an underseat dual exhaust, and performance upgrades including radial brakes, and, for the first time, a ram-air intake. Furthermore, earlier models' tendency for wheelies was reduced by changing the geometry of the frame and weight distribution. The all-new engine was no longer used as a stressed member of the chassis, and had a separate top crankcase and cylinder block.

The 2004 R1 weighs  dry. The conventional front brake calipers were replaced by radially mounted calipers, activated by a radial master cylinder. A factory-installed steering damper was also added in 2004. Combined with the changes to the frame, this helped to eliminate the tendency of the handlebars to shake violently during rapid acceleration or deceleration on less-than-perfect surfaces, a phenomenon known as speed wobble or a tank slapper.

2006

That year, Yamaha also released a limited edition version, the LE, in original Yamaha racing colors to celebrate its 50th anniversary. The LE and SP models had custom Öhlins front and rear suspension units developed by the same team as the YZR-M1 MotoGP bike. Custom forged aluminum Marchesini wheels specifically designed for the LE shaved nearly a pound off the bike's unsprung weight. A back torque-limiting slipper clutch and an integrated lap timer rounded out the package, essentially making the LE a production racer. Only 500 units were made for the United States, with another 500 units for Europe.

2007–2008

An all-new YZF-R1 for the 2007 model year was announced on 8 October 2006. It had an all-new inline-four engine, going back to a more conventional four-valve-per-cylinder design rather than Yamaha's trademark five-valve Genesis layout. It also had the Yamaha Chip Control Intake (YCC-I) electronic variable-length intake funnel system, Yamaha Chip Control Throttle (YCC-T) fly-by-wire throttle system, slipper clutch, all-new aluminum Deltabox frame and swingarm, six-piston radial-mount front brake calipers with 310 mm discs, a wider radiator, and M1 styling on the new large ram-air intakes in the front fairing. There were no major changes for 2008.

Power at the rear wheel was  @ 10,160 rpm.

2009–2014

In late 2008, Yamaha announced they would release an all new R1 for 2009. The new R1 took engine technology from the M1 MotoGP bike with its crossplane crankshaft, making the 2009 R1 the first production sports bike to use a crossplane crankshaft. Power delivery is the same as with a 90° V4 with a 180° crank (such as the Honda VFR800, and similar to the 65° V4 in the Yamaha V-Max). Yamaha claimed the bike would give the rider "two engines in one", with the low-end torque of a twin and the pace of an inline-four. As with the previous incarnation of the R1, the 2009 model used Yamaha Chip Control Throttle (YCC-T).

Another advancement included on the 2009 model was D-Mode Throttle Control Valve Mapping, which allows a rider to choose between three distinct maps depending on the rider's environment. Each mode of operation controls YCC-T characteristics, changing how the R1 reacts to rider input. The first mode is Standard Mode, which delivers performance for a wide variety of driving conditions. The second mode is "A" mode, which will give a rider more available power in the lower to mid RPM range. The third mode is "B" mode, a dialling back of the previous mode designed to soften throttle response in inclement weather and heavy traffic. D-Mode throttle control is controlled by the rider through a forward mode button near the throttle. The instrument panel was more comprehensive than previous models, and the 2009/2010 Yamaha YZF-R1 model had a gear indicator as standard.

Overall handling of the R1 was improved through changes to frame and suspension. A new cast magnesium subframe was designed for the 2009 R1, resulting in lower weight and aiding mass centralisation. The rear shock absorber on the 2009 offers variable speed damping, as well as easy-to-tweak screw-adjustable preload. The rear shock absorber connected underneath the swing arm via a linkage, a change from previous models. To improve overall handling and safety, Yamaha included an electronic steering damper.

The front had the same classic R1 design cues, though the air intake location and headlamp design were revamped on the 2009 model. This new design used only projector lamps in the headlights and used the newfound design space on the nose to position ram-air intakes next to the lights.

In 2012, the Yamaha YZF-R1 received traction control and a redesigned nose, and a special edition 50th Anniversary R1 was released. The special edition commemorates the participation of Yamaha in MotoGP, and its colours are inspired by the Assen TT-winning MotoGP bike. Only 2000 units of this edition were made.

2015–present

At the centennial EICMA motorcycle show, Yamaha officially unveiled a new generation of R1, similar to the contemporary YZR M1. Engine changes include a decreased bore-to-stroke ratio, a larger airbox, a finger-follower valve system, and fracture split titanium conrods. Magnesium wheels are standard, and information is presented to the rider through a user-customizable thin-film display.

The new bike has an electronics package that includes a sophisticated Traction Control System (TCS), a Slide Control System (SCS), an anti-wheelie Lift Control System (LIF), linked antilock brakes, a Launch Control System (LCS), a Quick Shift System (QSS), and selectable power modes. The Slide Control System on the R1 is the first on a production motorcycle. Information is fed to the bike through a six-axis inertial measurement unit and other sensors over 100 times a second. Power delivery is tapered through throttle valve manipulation and ignition and fuel cuts.

A second higher-spec, limited production model called the R1M is also produced, and is differentiated from the standard model by having more expensive components, such as electronic semi-active Öhlins suspension, carbon fiber bodywork, Yamaha's Communication Control Unit (CCU), a Y-TRAC data logging system, and grippier Bridgestone tires with a larger rear 200/55 size.

Starting in 2016, the lower-spec R1S model has also been offered.

At EICMA 2017 Yahama presented the next generation of R1 and R1M. They have a better Quick Shift System, an updated Lift (wheelie) Control System and fulfill Euro 4 requirements. The R1M got a new Öhlins Electronic Racing Suspension. In 2019 next new models started.

Specifications

Motorsport
The R1 achieved five victories in the Macau Grand Prix between 1999 and 2013. Lorenzo Alfonsi won the 2004 FIM Superstock 1000 Cup, followed by Didier Van Keymeulen in 2005.

Yamaha World Superbike riders Troy Corser and Noriyuki Haga finished 2nd and 3rd respectively in the 2008 Superbike World Championship season.

John McGuinness won the Senior and inaugural Superbike races at the 2005 Isle of Man TT.

Yamaha World Superbike rider Ben Spies won the 2009 Superbike World Championship season title, recording 14 wins and 11 poles in his one season in WSBK.

The Yamaha Factory Racing Team with riders N. Nakasuga, P. Espargaro, and B. Smith won the 2015 Suzuka 8 Hours endurance race. Katsuyuki Nakasuga, Alex Lowes and Pol Espargaro won the 2016 Suzuka 8 Hours race.

Tommy Hill won the British Superbike title in 2011 on board a YZF-R1. Yamaha rider Josh Brookes won the 2015 title.

See also
List of fastest production motorcycles by acceleration

References

External links

 

Sport bikes
YZF-R1
Motorcycles introduced in 1998